Max Mercury is a fictional DC Comics superhero similar to Quality Comics' Quicksilver. Initially an obscure speedster, the character was rebooted by Mark Waid in the pages of The Flash and turned into a mentor for Wally West and Bart Allen.

Publication history
He first appeared in Quality's National Comics #5, cover dated November 1940, as Quicksilver. Comics historian Don Markstein calls Quicksilver "probably the first imitator of the Flash's super-speed schtick".

Almost nothing was revealed about that character except that he possessed super-speed and his secret identity had the first name "Max". He appeared in National Comics until issue #73 (Aug 1949). He also made an appearance in Uncle Sam Quarterly (Winter 1941).

Due to the character's indistinct background, decades later writer Mark Waid was free to reinvent the character in The Flash without contradicting anything. When the character reappeared in early 1990s issues of The Flash, his name had to be changed from "Quicksilver" to "Mercury" to avoid confusion with Marvel Comics' Quicksilver.

Fictional character biography
In Waid's origin of the character, he was originally a scout with the US Cavalry in the 1830s. A friend of the local Indian tribes, he was shocked and dismayed to find them massacred on the orders of his commanding officer. Enchanted by a dying Indian shaman, he gained super-speed. In the years that followed, he became known to the Indians as Ahwehota ("He Who Runs Beyond The Wind"), and to everyone else as Windrunner.

Mercury has repeatedly traveled through time, seeking to enter the so-called Speed Force. He usually bounces off and finds himself decades in the future. His first attempt left him in the 1890s, where he created a new identity for himself as Whip Whirlwind. Later, he travelled ahead again, and was active in the 1930s and 1940s as Quicksilver when he acted as a mentor to the fledgling Golden Age Flash and Johnny Quick.

According to Jess Nevins' Encyclopedia of Golden Age Superheroes, "Quicksilver fights the Axis mesmerist Baron Hoff, the circus aerialists the Black Cats, the mad scientist Dr. Morlo, the Human Fly, the Screaming Skull, the Witch Doctor, and the Speed Demons, whose super-speed is derived from special pills".

In 1948, he had an affair with the wife of a doctor who had saved his life. When the doctor learned of this and his wife returned to her husband's side, Max fled into the future once more. He then reappeared in the early 1960s, where he battled Savitar and was bounced still further forward in time. He spent some years in hiding, but was persuaded by Garrick to return to action against Professor Zoom (who was posing as Barry Allen). In recent years, he has been the mentor of first Wally West and later Bart Allen (alias Impulse). He taught West about the Speed Force, and helped him to access his full speed by encouraging him to break a mental block he had placed on his powers—stopping Wally from being as fast as Barry because he would then have really replaced his uncle as the Flash. He also attempted to teach Impulse a measure of patience with varying results. While living with Bart, Max met an aged physician named Helen Claiborne, who turned out to be his daughter from his earlier affair.

During Impulse #88 (September 2002, one of the last issues), Max's body is possessed by the spirit of a Golden Age supervillain: the Rival. While still in Max's body, the Rival then escapes to some unknown place in time.

In Infinite Crisis #4, Max appears in the Speed Force, where his spirit was imprisoned after the Rival escaped from the very same peril by possessing Max's body. Max assists Johnny Quick, Bart Allen and other speedsters in taking the murderous Superboy-Prime to another realm far past the Speed Force.

In The Flash: Rebirth #4, Max has recently been brought back, as the recently returned Barry Allen helps take him out of the "Negative Speed Force" controlled by Professor Zoom. Since this follows the possible continuity changes of the "Crisis Trilogy", it is unclear whether the Rival is still in possession of Mercury's original body.

Powers and abilities
Max is a human granted superhuman speed by ancient Native American rituals. His speed is enough that he can accelerate well beyond the standard Mach 1 super-speed limit, or the speed of sound; though he cannot reach escape velocity. Over time, he tried to find the fuel for his powers (and those of other speedsters): the Speed Force. Though he never quite entered it nor obtained its energies to power his speed, his attempts allowed him to travel forward through time.

Among his peers, Max is unique in his attempts to understand the Speed Force in a mystical way (referred to by other characters as "Zen"). He also differs from other speedsters because of his agility; he cannot run as quickly as the Flashes, but he has a greater ability to perform acrobatic stunts and finely coordinated actions than they do. Thus, he was even able to outmaneuver Professor Zoom during their initial fight, although Zoom still gained the advantage by threatening innocent people.

Other versions

Flashpoint
In the Flashpoint reality, Windrunner is in the 18th century when he was approached by Kid Flash (who was being controlled by the Speed Force) and then reduces Windrunner's speed killing him to give the Flash power to stop the near-past Flash himself.

In other media
 Two Max Mercury figures were released as a part of HeroClix's "The Flash" set.
 DC Direct released a six-inch figure of Max Mercury in 2000.

References

External links
 Profile from "The Flash: Those Who Ride The Lightning" website
 Quicksilver Index
 Quicksilver Profile
 DC Cosmic Teams Profile: Quicksilver/Max Mercury 

Comics characters introduced in 1940
Quality Comics superheroes
DC Comics superheroes
DC Comics characters who can move at superhuman speeds
DC Comics metahumans
Comics about time travel
Characters created by Jack Cole
Comics characters introduced in 1993
Characters created by Mark Waid
Golden Age superheroes
Fictional characters who can turn intangible
Fictional characters who can manipulate time
Fictional characters with dimensional travel abilities
Fictional characters with density control abilities
Time travelers
Flash (comics) characters
Fictional people from the 19th-century